Peppi Schwaiger (11 September 1930 – 22 April 2014) was a German alpine skier who competed in the 1952 Winter Olympics and in the 1956 Winter Olympics.

References

1930 births
2014 deaths
German male alpine skiers
Olympic alpine skiers of Germany
Olympic alpine skiers of the United Team of Germany
Alpine skiers at the 1952 Winter Olympics
Alpine skiers at the 1956 Winter Olympics
20th-century German people